Kodala Union is a union in Rangunia Upazila, Bangladesh.

References 

Unions of Rangunia Upazila